Keegan Cole Thompson (born March 13, 1995) is an American professional baseball pitcher for the Chicago Cubs of Major League Baseball (MLB). He made his MLB debut in 2021.

Amateur career
Thompson attended Cullman High School in Cullman, Alabama. As a sophomore in 2011, he was named Alabama's Gatorade Player of the Year after finishing the season with a 9–2 record and a 1.70 ERA along with batting .433 with 17 home runs and 66 RBIs. He won the award once again as a senior in 2013 after going 9–2 with a 1.25 ERA, striking out 124 batters in  innings pitched, along with hitting .420 with nine home runs and 43 RBIs. Undrafted out of high school, he enrolled at Auburn University where he played college baseball for the Auburn Tigers.

In 2014, as a freshman for the Tigers, Thompson appeared in 14 games (with 12 being starts) in which he compiled a 5–3 record with a 2.01 ERA, earning him a spot on the SEC All-Freshman Team. As a sophomore in 2015, he pitched to a 7–3 record with a 3.10 ERA in 12 games (11 starts) in a season that was shortened due to elbow issues. 

He underwent Tommy John surgery in June 2015, and was forced to miss the whole 2016 season. Despite not pitching in 2016, he was still drafted by the Detroit Tigers in the 33rd round of the 2016 MLB draft, but did not sign. He returned to Auburn in 2017 as a redshirt junior, compiling a 7–4 record and a 2.41 ERA in 15 starts.

Professional career
Thompson was selected by the Chicago Cubs in the third round of the 2017 Major League Baseball draft. He signed with the Cubs for $511,900. After signing, Thompson made his professional debut with the Eugene Emeralds where he was 1–2 with a 2.37 ERA in 19 innings pitched. He began 2018 with the Myrtle Beach Pelicans, with whom he was named the Carolina League Pitcher of the Week twice. After compiling a 3–3 record with a 3.19 ERA in 12 starts, he was promoted to the Tennessee Smokies in June. He spent the remainder of the season with the Smokies, going 6–3 with a 4.06 ERA in 13 starts.

Thompson returned to Tennessee to begin the 2019 season. He experienced elbow soreness. He was placed on the injured list in April with an elbow injury, and only made two rehab appearances during the remaining months of the season. He was selected to play in the Arizona Fall League for the Mesa Solar Sox following the season. There, he was 1-1 with a 4.62 ERA in seven starts.

Thompson did not play a minor league game in 2020 due to the cancellation of the minor league season caused by the COVID-19 pandemic. The Cubs added him to their 40-man roster after the 2020 season. 

On May 1, 2021, Thompson was promoted to the major leagues for the first time. He made his MLB debut the next day, pitching a shutout inning of relief against the Cincinnati Reds. On May 8, he recorded his first win after pitching three innings of relief against the Pittsburgh Pirates. He was put on the 10-day injured list at the end of the season with right shoulder inflammation and soreness. For his 2021 rookie year with the Cubs, he went 3-3 with a 3.38 ERA, 55 strikeouts, and 31 walks over  innings.

On April 9, 2022, Thompson was ejected for throwing at Andrew McCutchen of the Milwaukee Brewers. Thompson was also fined and suspended for three games.

References

External links

Auburn Tigers bio

1995 births
Living people
Arizona League Cubs players
Auburn Tigers baseball players
Baseball players from Alabama
Chicago Cubs players
Eugene Emeralds players
Major League Baseball pitchers
Mesa Solar Sox players
Myrtle Beach Pelicans players
People from Cullman, Alabama
Tennessee Smokies players
United States national baseball team players